USS Emery (DE-28) was an  constructed for the United States Navy during World War II. It was promptly sent off into the Pacific Ocean to protect convoys and other ships from Japanese submarines and fighter aircraft. By the end of the war, she had accumulated three battle stars.

Namesake
Jack Mandeville Emery was born on 9 October 1916 in Los Angeles, California. He was killed in action when Arizona was sunk in the Attack on Pearl Harbor on 7 December 1941.

Construction and commissioning
She was launched on 17 April 1943 by Mare Island Navy Yard as BDE-28; reallocated to the United States; assigned the name Eisner on 14 June 1943; renamed Emery on 14 July 1943; and commissioned on 14 August 1943.

Service history

World War II
Emery cleared Pearl Harbor on 1 November 1943 for Funafuti and a month of local escort duty in preparation for the invasion of the Gilbert Islands, during which she screened vulnerable tankers fueling assault ships and their covering force of major combatants. She returned to Pearl Harbor on 16 December for training, and on 16 January 1944 put to sea to protect tankers again during the assault on the Marshall Islands, after which she escorted convoys between Majuro and Funafuti until 9 March.

From March–September, Emery sailed out of Port Purvis on Florida Island in the Solomons, escorting combatants, auxiliaries, and merchantmen to Emirau, Green Island, Bougainville Island, and other southwest Pacific ports. She arrived at Manus Island on 27 September, and after screening a small convoy to the Russell Islands, proceeded to Peleliu for antisubmarine patrol and an escort voyage to Ulithi. She returned to Ulithi for brief overhaul in November, then swung back through the Marshall and Mariana Islands on convoy duty, arriving at Eniwetok on 4 March. This was her base through July 1945 as she carried out escort missions to Guam, Saipan, Ulithi, Iwo Jima, and Kwajalein. Thus, she guarded the movement of men and supplies essential to the seaborne advance on Japan.

On 5 July, she sailed for San Francisco, California, where she was decommissioned on 15 November 1945, and sold from scrap on 21 July 1947.

Awards

References

External links
NavSource Online: Destroyer Escort Photo Archive - USS Emery (DE-28)

Evarts-class destroyer escorts
Ships built in Vallejo, California
1943 ships
World War II frigates and destroyer escorts of the United States